Timothy Carter Corbin (born August 5, 1961) is the head baseball coach of the Vanderbilt Commodores baseball team. Since becoming coach at Vanderbilt in 2003, Corbin has transformed the Commodores from a perennial Southeastern Conference doormat to an elite program. When he arrived in 2003, Vanderbilt had only had six winning seasons in SEC play since baseball became a scholarship sport in 1968, and had only been to three NCAA Tournaments in school history. Since then, they have been to all but one NCAA Tournament since 2004.

On June 25, 2014, he led the team to Vanderbilt's first ever men's NCAA Championship in any sport, winning the College World Series.  In his first ten years, Corbin amassed a 411-217 record with the Commodores. His 2013 Commodores team set an SEC record for wins, going 26-3 in conference. On May 2, 2014, Corbin won his 500th game at Vanderbilt in an 8-3 victory over Missouri.

Before coming to Vanderbilt, Corbin served as an assistant coach at Clemson for nine years and as head coach at Presbyterian for six years. At Clemson, he worked under head coach Jack Leggett, on the same staff with future head coaches and SEC rivals Kevin O'Sullivan and John Pawlowski. He coached three ACC Players of the Year and helped Clemson reach the College World Series four times (1995, 1996, 2000, and 2002). At Presbyterian, Corbin helped direct a program that was dormant for several years. He compiled a 106-138 record with the Blue Hose, which was transitioning from NAIA to NCAA Division II. The Blue Hose made three consecutive appearances in the South Atlantic Conference playoffs (1991–93), and Corbin earned South Atlantic Coach of the Year honors in 1990. In 2000, he was named the ABCA/Baseball America Assistant Coach of the Year.

Corbin also served as manager for the USA Baseball National Team during the summer of 2006. He led the team to a 28-2-1 record that culminated with a gold medal finish at the FISU (International University Sports Federation) World University Championship in Havana, Cuba. The .919 winning percentage was the highest ever for a national team and it garnered special recognition by the United States Olympic Committee in September. Additionally, Corbin managed three of his Commodore players on this team: David Price, Pedro Alvarez, and Casey Weathers.

Head coaching record

First-round MLB draft picks coached
At Vanderbilt, Corbin has coached nineteen players selected in the first round of the Major League Baseball Draft, including two selected first overall, and one (Kumar Rocker) selected in the first round in two different drafts.
Jeremy Sowers (6th overall, Cleveland Indians, 2004 MLB Draft)
David Price (1st overall, Tampa Bay Rays, 2007 MLB Draft)
Casey Weathers (8th overall, Colorado Rockies, 2007 MLB Draft)
Pedro Alvarez (2nd overall, Pittsburgh Pirates, 2008 MLB Draft)
Ryan Flaherty (41st overall, Chicago Cubs, 2008 MLB Draft)
Mike Minor (7th overall, Atlanta Braves, 2009 MLB Draft)
Sonny Gray (18th overall, Oakland Athletics, 2011 MLB Draft)
Grayson Garvin (59th overall, Tampa Bay Rays, 2011 MLB Draft)
Tyler Beede (14th overall, San Francisco Giants, 2014 MLB Draft)
Dansby Swanson (1st overall, Arizona Diamondbacks, 2015 MLB Draft)
Carson Fulmer (8th overall, Chicago White Sox, 2015 MLB Draft)
Walker Buehler (24th overall, Los Angeles Dodgers, 2015 MLB Draft)
Kyle Wright (5th overall, Atlanta Braves, 2017 MLB Draft)
Jeren Kendall (23rd overall, Los Angeles Dodgers, 2017 MLB Draft)
JJ Bleday (4th overall, Miami Marlins, 2019 MLB Draft)
Austin Martin (5th overall, Toronto Blue Jays, 2020 MLB Draft)
Jack Leiter (2nd overall, Texas Rangers, 2021 MLB Draft)
Kumar Rocker (10th overall, New York Mets, 2021 MLB Draft; & 3rd overall, Texas Rangers, 2022 MLB Draft)
Spencer Jones, (25th overall, New York Yankees, 2022 MLB Draft)

Awards and honors
2007 CollegeBaseballInsider.com National Coach of the Year
2007 SEC Coach of the Year
 2013 SEC Coach of the Year 
2014 Baseball America College Coach of the Year 
2014 Collegiate Baseball National Coach of the Year 
2014 Perfect Game Coach of the Year 
 2019 SEC Coach of the Year

See also
List of current NCAA Division I baseball coaches

References

External links
 Vanderbilt profile

1961 births
Living people
Baseball coaches from New Hampshire
Clemson Tigers baseball coaches
Presbyterian Blue Hose baseball coaches
Vanderbilt Commodores baseball coaches
People from Wolfeboro, New Hampshire
Sportspeople from Carroll County, New Hampshire
Ohio Wesleyan Battling Bishops baseball players